State Route 68 (SR 68) is a  state highway in the eastern part of the U.S. state of Tennessee.

Route description

SR 68 begins in southeastern Tennessee, at an intersection with Georgia State Route 5 (SR 5) and SR 60 at the Tennessee–Georgia state line in Copperhill, Tennessee, and McCaysville, Georgia. It then goes north to Ducktown where it junctions with U.S. Route 64 (US 64) and US 74. The route continues north and enters the Cherokee National Forest and goes through a mostly rural area, then in Turtletown it turns east and junctions with SR 123. SR 68 then turns back north and continues through a sparsely populated area and crosses over the Hiwassee River. The route then becomes curvy and dangerous. It then enters Monroe County and goes through Coker Creek and then Tellico Plains and junctions with SR 165 (Cherohala Skyway). In Tellico Plains, SR 68 serves as the eastern terminus for SR 39; it then proceeds north to Madisonville where it meets US 411/SR 33. After this junction, the route then turns more northwesterly toward Sweetwater and passes The Lost Sea. In Sweetwater, it turns west and junctions with US 11 and Interstate 75 (I-75).

Just past the I-75 junction, the route enters McMinn County where there are no highway junctions. It then enters Meigs County and Ten Mile and junctions with SR 305, SR 58, and brief runs concurrently with SR 304. It then crosses Watts Bar Dam and the Tennessee River into Rhea County near the Watts Bar Nuclear Plant and continues west. The route then has a  concurrency with SR 302 and a  concurrency with US 27/SR 29. US 27 and SR 68 go north to Spring City where SR 68 turns back west and US 27 goes north. Just after leaving Spring City, it turns back to north crosses over Waldens Ridge into Cumberland County where the route ends at a Y-intersection with US 127/SR 28 in Cumberland Homesteads near Crossville and Cumberland Mountain State Park.

History

Major intersections

See also

References

External links
 

068
Transportation in Polk County, Tennessee
Transportation in Monroe County, Tennessee
Transportation in McMinn County, Tennessee
Transportation in Meigs County, Tennessee
Transportation in Rhea County, Tennessee
Transportation in Cumberland County, Tennessee